Bankhaus Spängler or Bankhaus Carl Spängler & Co. AG is the oldest private bank in Austria founded in the state capital of Salzburg in 1828.

History 
The banking house was founded by Johann Alois Duregger, who applied for commercial banking authorization in 1828. In 1854, Carl Spangler joined the company and one year later married Duregger's daughter. The Spängler family has run the bank for seven generations since 1855.

References 
Article contains translated text from Bankhaus Spängler on the German Wikipedia retrieved on 7 March 2017.

External links 

Homepage

Banks of Austria
Banks established in 1828
19th-century establishments in Austria
1828 establishments in the Austrian Empire
Companies based in Salzburg